The discography of American country music artist Mickey Guyton contains one studio album, four extended plays, nine singles, 14 promotional singles, one additionally-charting song, seven music videos and two album appearances. Signed to Capitol Records Nashville, Guyton released her debut extended play in 2014 titled Unbreakable. It charted at number 14 on the Billboard Top Heatseekers survey shortly after its debut. 

In 2015, the label issued her first single, "Better Than You Left Me". The song was her first to reach the Billboard Hot Country Songs chart, where it peaked in the top 40. It also reached a similar position on Billboard'''s Canada Country chart. Guyton's self-titled second EP was also released in 2015, peaking at number 15 on the Top Heatseekers chart. 

In 2016, Capitol Nashville issued her follow-up single titled "Heartbreak Song", which peaked outside the country top 40. Over the next several years, Guyton released several singles including "Sister" and "Crazy". Guyton also used this time to rework her musical identity and began writing more music about her experiences as a black woman. Her first single following this re-emergence was 2020's "What Are You Gonna Tell Her?". This was followed by "Black Like Me," which went viral during the summer of 2020. In September 2020, Guyton released her third EP titled Bridges. 

She then recorded "Boys" with Dean Brody, which reached number one on the Canada Country chart, giving Guyton her first number one (and top 10) on any chart. Her debut album, Remember Her Name'', was released on September 24, 2021.

Studio albums

Extended plays

Singles

As lead artist

As a featured artist

Promotional singles

Other charted songs

Music videos

Other album appearances

Notes

References

External links
 Mickey Guyton music at her official website

Discographies of American artists
Country music discographies